Jonas Bloch (born February 8, 1939) is a Brazilian actor. Most known for his television roles as villains, Bloch is descendant of Ukrainian-Jewish people and father of actress Débora Bloch.

Selected filmography
 Quilombo (1984)
 Avaete, Seed of Revenge (1985)
 The Man in the Black Cape (1986)
 Top Model (1989)
 Mulheres de Areia (1993)
 A Viagem (1994)
 Tropicaliente (1994)
 Irmãos Coragem (1995)
 Malhação (1998)
 O Circo das Qualidades Humanas (2000)
 Woman on Top (2000)
 Mango Yellow (2002)
 O Quinto dos Infernos (2002)
 Jamais Te Esquecerei (2003)
 A Lei e o Crime (2009)
 Bela, a Feia (2009)
 Vitória (2014)

References

External links

1939 births
Brazilian male film actors
Brazilian male stage actors
Brazilian male television actors
Brazilian people of Ukrainian-Jewish descent
Jewish Brazilian male actors
Living people
People from Belo Horizonte